Farzana Dua Elahe (9 February 1990 is  an English actress and music DJ. She is best known for her role of Parveen Abbasi in the BBC soap opera EastEnders.

Early life
Elahe studied at the BRIT School in London.

Acting career
In 2009, Elahe played the role of Parveen Abbasi on four episodes of BBC soap opera EastEnders. Her television credits include Doctors, The Bill, The Omid Djalili Show, Holby City, Lewis, Silent Witness and Broadchurch.

In 2008, she played Muna and Jasminka in David Edgar's play Testing the Echo at Out of Joint and Tricycle Theatre. In 2009, she played the role of Aisha in Atiha Sen Gupta's play What Fatima Did at the Hampstead Theatre. Her other stage performances include roles in Burn, Chatroom, Citizenship and Catch.

In January 2010, Elahe played the role of Hosna Bint Mahmoud in BBC Radio 3's radio adaptation of Tayeb Salih's novel Season of Migration to the North. In 2011, she played a supporting role in Menhaj Huda's feature film Everywhere and Nowhere. In 2014, she played the role of Mahira in the film adaptation of Richard C. Morais' novel The Hundred-Foot Journey.

Music career
In late 2010, Elahe broke on to the UK club scene, gained gigs at clubs in London and later international gigs. At the start of 2012, she met Lauren Elle while djing at the same event and came together to form South East London-based DJ/producer duo Habit To Others.

Habit To Others play deep house, deep techno, house and disco music and have been influenced by garage, acid house, hardcore techno, drum and bass and jungle. They currently play gigs all over London in the underground House scene. They are residents at London Club night Connected. The venues they have played include McQueens Shoreditch, Cable, Hidden, Brickhouse, Es Vive Ibiza, THAT Club, Café de Paris, Gautama Bar, Boho Bar, Friends of Mine Bar, Whitehouse Clapham, Bedrock, Factory and Fashion Cafe Dubai.

Filmography

Television

Film

Stage

Radio

See also
 British Bangladeshi
 List of British Bangladeshis

References

External links
 
 
 Habit To Others website
 

Living people
English Muslims
English people of Bangladeshi descent
English stage actresses
English television actresses
English soap opera actresses
English film actresses
English radio actresses
English actresses of South Asian descent
21st-century English actresses
English DJs
English record producers
Club DJs
Women DJs
Actresses from London
People from London
People educated at the BRIT School
Electronic dance music DJs
British women record producers
Year of birth missing (living people)